Liver King is the online alias of fitness social media personality Brian Johnson. He is known for promoting what he calls an "ancestral lifestyle", which includes eating large amounts of raw organs and meat, and he recommends eating liver daily. His diet has been criticized by nutritionists for being potentially dangerous. Johnson preaches his nine "ancestral tenets": sleep, eat, move, shield, connect, cold, sun, fight, bond.

Despite repeatedly denying having ever used anabolic steroids to attain his physique, it was revealed he regularly used multiple drugs, including a synthetic protein and testosterone, and $11,000 worth of steroids per month. After emails showing his use of steroids and hormones came to light, Johnson made a video in which he admitted to taking around 120 mg of testosterone per week and apologized for misleading his viewers about his "pharmacological intervention", while also adding that there is "a time and place" for such interventions to be made.

References 

Living people
TikTokers
American bodybuilders
Male bodybuilders
Year of birth missing (living people)